Hanmi Bank is a community bank headquartered in Los Angeles, California, with 35 branches and eight loan production offices in California, Texas, Illinois, New York, New Jersey and Virginia.

Hanmi Bank specializes in real estate, commercial, Small Business Administration loans and trade finance lending to small and middle market businesses. It is a wholly owned subsidiary of Hanmi Financial Corporation, Inc.

History 
The bank was established in 1982. Originally it was founded to serve the Korean-American community in Los Angeles.

The bank was founded by George S. Chey, who served as Chairman of the Board for 10 years after its startup.

In 1987, the Hanmi Bank conducted its IPO and is listed on Nasdaq.

The bank bought the First Global Bank and the Pacific Union Bank and the Chun Ha Insurance Agency.  In 2001, the company listed on Nasdaq.  Subsequently, the bank expanded to include insurance and wealth management services.

In 2014, it acquired United Central Bank.

References

External links
Hanmi Bank: Personal, Business, and Online Banking Services

Companies listed on the Nasdaq
Banks established in 1982
Banks based in California
Companies based in Los Angeles
Korean-American culture in Los Angeles
Korean American banks